Goshen Township is a township in Muscatine County, Iowa, in the United States.

History
Goshen Township was organized in 1857. It was first settled around 1837.

References

Townships in Muscatine County, Iowa
Townships in Iowa
1857 establishments in Iowa
Populated places established in 1857